Oskar Fridrich Woldemar Mildebrath March 2, 1849 – January 9, 1900 was a pharmacist in Estonia who founded one of the oldest rural pharmacies in the country that stayed in business continuously at the same place, in the same building for 122 years.

Oskar Mildebrath was born on March 2, 1849 in Koluvere, Läänemaa, Governorate of Estonia to Martin Friedrich Mildebrath and Julie Elisabeth (née Anderson). Martin Friedrich Mildebrath himself was originally from Woedtke in Prussia.

Oskar Mildebrath graduated as a pharmacist from University of Tartu. He worked at the Haapsalu pharmacy between 1875 and 1877. In 1877-1878 he participated in the Russo-Turkish War. From 1880 to 1885 he worked at Raeapteek, the Tallinn's Town Hall Pharmacy, where he was the first Estonian speaking pharmacist with a university degree. Oskar Mildebrath was also a member of the Society of Estonian Literati and considered one of the most outstanding intellectuals living in the town at the time.

On July 30, 1886 Oskar Mildebrath founded one of the oldest rural pharmacies in Estonia, at Kullamaa. It stayed in business continuously for 122 years, until 2008.

References 

1849 births
1900 deaths
Pharmacists
People from Lääne-Nigula Parish
People from the Governorate of Estonia
University of Tartu alumni
19th-century Estonian people